Arne Dahl (May 7, 1907 – February 2, 1974) was a North Dakota Republican Party politician who served as the last North Dakota Commissioner of Agriculture and Labor from 1965 to 1966, and as the first North Dakota Commissioner of Agriculture from 1966 to 1974. He died in office in 1974 at age 66.

1907 births
1974 deaths
North Dakota Commissioners of Agriculture and Labor
North Dakota Commissioners of Agriculture
North Dakota Republicans
20th-century American politicians